Jose Manuel Gomez Vazquez Aldana (born 2 October 1937) is a Mexican architect with a long career and international recognition. Creator of residential projects and monumental works in the United States and Latin America is founder of the international architecture studio "Gomez Vazquez International".

Studies in Guadalajara and the United States 
He studied Architecture at the University of Guadalajara, being student of the professors Bruno Cadore, Silvio Alberti, Herrero Morales, Horst Hartung, Eric Coufal, Julio de la Peña -who transmitted his skill in the drawing of planes-  and Ignacio Diaz Morales, who taught him to appreciate the scope of architecture. He learned sensuality as an artistic vehicle from his contemporary Marco Aldaco, who also taught him the value of watercolor.

He worked with the engineer Jorge Garcia de Quevedo:
"There were no architects, so the engineers designed their own houses. At that time I still had not finished my studies but as I had talent for designing and drawing, suddenly found myself making houses and buildings even though I had not graduated."
In a short period Gomez Vazquez finished his degree in 1961 and set up his own studio "Taller de Arquitectura" with his brother Jaime.

In 1967 he was invited to the United States with the "Eisenhower Exchange Fellowship"  for an 11-month stay. During his studies and stay in North America he met the best architects in the world as Walter Gropius, Mies van der Rohe, Louis Kahn, IM Pei, Yamasaki, Skidmore Owings & Merril, Victor Gruen, Alvar Aalto, Morris Lapidus and Constantinos Doxiadis, the father of ekistics and integral urban planning that already included sustainability. 
He spent a season with Doxiadis and visited the Athens Ekistic Center, joining the World Society for Ekistics, where he was Vice President.

Professional development 
Invited by the Urban Land Institute to visit some avant-garde urban and tourist developments he met brothers Willard and James Rouse, who had just built the new city of Columbia, located between Baltimore and Washington.

During his studies and many trips to different cities in the United States he established various professional relationships, was named  Honorary Citizen and received the key to the cities of New Orleans, Houston, Washington and Miami. He is also Honorary Consul of Poland in Guadalajara.

He organized the first bullfight at the Astrodome, invited by former Houston mayor, Judge Roy Hoffins. This show was organized together with the bullfighting entrepreneur Leodegario Hernandez, owner of the bullring in Guadalajara, Leon and Monterrey.

Founder of "Gomez Vazquez International" 
After graduation in 1961 he founded the study "Taller de Arquitectura" in Guadalajara with his brother Jaime and Ernesto Escobar.  During his stay in the United States the study already had 30 architects for the design of buildings, houses and large-scale works such as the Hotel Tapatio or the Plaza de Toros Nuevo Progreso, so he traveled to Mexico every five weeks.

In one of his trips he decided to change the structure and image of his office, founding the firm "Gómez Vázquez Aldana y Asociados", inspired by the image of Wilson, Crane & Anderson, the Houston firm that designed the Astrodome. 
These were fundamental in the contemporary architectural development, planning and sustainable architecture of Mexico and Latin America and pioneer of avant-garde designs and lifestyles.

With a younger generation of architects at the beginning of 2000 and with his son Juan Carlos Gomez Castellanos as director, the firm moved to a new level of internationalization strengthening its presence in Panama, Dominican Republic and Puerto Rico through multidisciplinary proposals and large structures that integrated into nature.

Faced with the challenges of globalization and sustainable planning in 2013, the study renamed as "Gomez Vazquez International". The firm is considered among the 100 most important architecture studios worldwide by the British magazine Building Design (in position 65 of the WA 100 list).

The firm has offices in Guadalajara, Mexico City, San Antonio and Austin (Texas), and Panama and also works in Colombia, Nicaragua, Honduras, the Dominican Republic, and Florida.

Regional development 
In his native land of Jalisco he was an important factor in the planning, urbanism and regional development. He created the real estate Urban Jal that stood out for its innovation and creativity, with subdivisions such as Jardines de la Cruz and San Miguel de la Colina.

Urban Jal partnered with the Japanese corporation Marubeni, the third largest in Japan after Mitsubishi and Mitsui, conforming the construction company "Surban", and building "Residencial la Cruz". The company ended after the devaluation of the Mexican peso in 1993.

Selected projects 
 Monumental Bullring of Jalisco, now known as "Nuevo Progreso" (1966–1967). It was commissioned by the bullfighting businessman Leodegario Hernandez who asked him, after showing the sketch of another architect that he disliked "I give you fifteen days to present a project" so he barely slept 3 or 4 hours until he presented it and got the work.
 Sanctuary of the Martyrs in Guadalajara. Monumental work that houses 65,000 people, commissioned by the Archdiocese of Guadalajara, it is under construction.
 Palace of Culture and Communication (PALCCO) in Zapopan (Guadalajara, 2016).
 Global City, urban development in 1300 hectares (Panama).
 Los Tules (Puerto Vallarta, 1979).
 Estadio Yaquis (baseball), in Ciudad Obregón, 2014–2016.
 Reform and remodeling of Jalisco Stadium (Guadalajara, 1970).
 Tapalpa Country Club (Tapalpa, Jalisco 1994).
 Isla Iguana (Puerto Vallarta, Jalisco 1993).

Awards and honours 
 "Eisenhower Fellow" – "Eisenhower Exchange Fellowship", United States of America (1968).
 Honorary citizen and kyes of the cities: Miami, Washington, New Orleans, and Houston.
 "Arquitectura Jalisco Honoris Causa" Prize (1993).
 Medal of Honor "Adolf B. Horn Jr.", Business Merit Jalisco (1990).
 Architecture Distinguished Recognition, National Tourism Sector (Concanaco) by President Fox (2005).
 International Award for Sustainable Architecture, Cemex (2005).
 Habitat Architecture and Design Award "38 years of Excellence in Architecture and Urban Planning" (2006).
 Award of the College of Engineers and Architects State Jalisco CICEJ, Excellence in Professional Career (2011).
 Ibero-American Tribute for Professional Career of Excellence granted by the Universidad del Valle de Mexico (2013).
 Prize awarded for his long career dedicated to art and design by the Magazine Mexico Design, Guadalajara "(2016).
 AAA Five Diamond Awards – Hotel Ritz Carlton Cancún (2015).

References

External links 
 Official website

Mexican architects
1937 births
Living people
People from Guadalajara, Jalisco